Lectins are carbohydrate-binding proteins that are highly specific for sugar groups that are part of other molecules, so cause agglutination of particular cells or precipitation of glycoconjugates and polysaccharides. Lectins have a role in recognition at the cellular and molecular level and play numerous roles in biological recognition phenomena involving cells, carbohydrates, and proteins. Lectins also mediate attachment and binding of bacteria, viruses, and fungi to their intended targets.

Lectins are ubiquitous in nature and are found in many foods. Some foods, such as beans and grains, need to be cooked, fermented or sprouted to reduce lectin content. Some lectins are beneficial, such as CLEC11A, which promotes bone growth, while others may be powerful toxins such as   ricin.

Lectins may be disabled by specific mono- and oligosaccharides, which bind to ingested lectins from grains, legumes, nightshade plants, and dairy; binding can prevent their attachment to the carbohydrates within the cell membrane. The selectivity of lectins means that they are useful for analyzing blood type, and they have been researched for potential use in genetically engineered crops to transfer pest resistance.

Etymology

William C. Boyd alone and then together with Elizabeth Shapleigh introduced the term "lectin" in 1954 from the Latin word lectus, "chosen" (from the verb legere, to choose or pick out).

Biological functions
Lectins occur ubiquitously in nature. They may bind to a soluble carbohydrate or to a carbohydrate moiety that is a part of a glycoprotein or glycolipid. They typically agglutinate certain animal cells and/or precipitate glycoconjugates. Most lectins do not possess enzymatic activity.

Animals
Lectins have these functions in animals:
 The regulation of cell adhesion
 The regulation of glycoprotein synthesis
 The regulation of blood protein levels
 The binding of soluble extracellular and intercellular glycoproteins
 As a receptor on the surface of mammalian liver cells for the recognition of galactose residues, which results in removal of certain glycoproteins from the circulatory system
 As a receptor that recognizes hydrolytic enzymes containing mannose-6-phosphate, and targets these proteins for delivery to the lysosomes; I-cell disease is one type of defect in this particular system.
 Lectins are known to play important roles in the innate immune system. Lectins such as the mannose-binding lectin, help mediate the first-line defense against invading microorganisms. Other immune lectins play a role in self-nonself discrimination and they likely modulate inflammatory and autoreactive processes. Intelectins (X-type lectins) bind microbial glycans and may function in the innate immune system as well. Lectins may be involved in pattern recognition and pathogen elimination in the innate immunity of vertebrates including fishes.

Plants
The function of lectins in plants (legume lectin) is still uncertain. Once thought to be necessary for rhizobia binding, this proposed function was ruled out through lectin-knockout transgene studies.

The large concentration of lectins in plant seeds decreases with growth, and suggests a role in plant germination and perhaps in the seed's survival itself. The binding of glycoproteins on the surface of parasitic cells also is believed to be a function. Several plant lectins have been found to recognize noncarbohydrate ligands that are primarily hydrophobic in nature, including adenine, auxins, cytokinin, and indole acetic acid, as well as water-soluble porphyrins. These interactions may be physiologically relevant, since some of these molecules function as phytohormones.

Lectin receptor kinases (LecRKs) are believed to recognize damage associated molecular patterns (DAMPs), which are created or released from herbivore attack. In Arabidopsis, legume-type LecRKs Clade 1 has 11 LecRK proteins. LecRK-1.8 has been reported to recognize extracellular NAD molecules and LecRK-1.9 has been reported to recognize extracellular ATP molecules.

Bacteria and viruses

Some hepatitis C viral glycoproteins may attach to C-type lectins on the host cell surface (liver cells) to initiate infection. To avoid clearance from the body by the innate immune system, pathogens (e.g., virus particles and bacteria that infect human cells) often express surface lectins known as adhesins and hemagglutinins that bind to tissue-specific glycans on host cell-surface glycoproteins and glycolipids. Multiple viruses, including influenza and several viruses in the Paramyxoviridae family, use this mechanism to bind and gain entry to target cells.

Use

In medicine and medical research
Purified lectins are important in a clinical setting because they are used for blood typing. Some of the glycolipids and glycoproteins on an individual's red blood cells can be identified by lectins.
 A lectin from Dolichos biflorus is used to identify cells that belong to the A1 blood group.
 A lectin from Ulex europaeus is used to identify the H blood group antigen.
 A lectin from Vicia graminea is used to identify the N blood group antigen.
 A lectin from Iberis amara is used to identify the M blood group antigen.
 A lectin from coconut milk is used to identify Theros antigen.
 A lectin from Carex is used to identify R antigen.
In neuroscience, the anterograde labeling method is used to trace the path of efferent axons with PHA-L, a lectin from the kidney bean.

A lectin (BanLec) from bananas inhibits HIV-1 in vitro. Achylectins, isolated from Tachypleus tridentatus, show specific agglutinating activity against human A-type erythrocytes. Anti-B agglutinins such as anti-BCJ and anti-BLD separated from Charybdis japonica and Lymantria dispar, respectively, are of value both in routine blood grouping and research.

In studying carbohydrate recognition by proteins

Lectins from legume plants, such as PHA or concanavalin A, have been used widely as model systems to understand the molecular basis of how proteins recognize carbohydrates, because they are relatively easy to obtain and have a wide variety of sugar specificities. The many crystal structures of legume lectins have led to a detailed insight of the atomic interactions between carbohydrates and proteins.

As a biochemical tool
Concanavalin A and other commercially available lectins have been used widely in affinity chromatography for purifying glycoproteins.

In general, proteins may be characterized with respect to glycoforms and carbohydrate structure by means of affinity chromatography, blotting, affinity electrophoresis, and affinity immunoelectrophoreis with lectins, as well as in microarrays, as in evanescent-field fluorescence-assisted lectin microarray.

In biochemical warfare
One example of the powerful biological attributes of lectins is the biochemical warfare agent ricin. The protein ricin is isolated from seeds of the castor oil plant and comprises two protein domains. Abrin from the jequirity pea is similar:
 One domain is a lectin that binds cell surface galactosyl residues and enables the protein to enter cells.
 The second domain is an N-glycosidase that cleaves nucleobases from ribosomal RNA, resulting in inhibition of protein synthesis and cell death.

Dietary lectin

Lectins are widespread in nature, and many foods contain the proteins. Some lectins can be harmful if poorly cooked or consumed in great quantities. They are most potent when raw; boiling, stewing or soaking in water for several hours can render most lectins inactive. Cooking raw beans at low heat,  though, such as in a slow cooker, will not remove all the lectins.

Some studies have found that lectins may interfere with absorption of some minerals, such as calcium, iron, phosphorus, and zinc. The binding of lectins to cells in the digestive tract may disrupt the breakdown and absorption of some nutrients, and as they bind to cells for long periods of time, some theories hold that they may play a role in certain inflammatory conditions such as rheumatoid arthritis and type 1 diabetes, but research supporting claims of long-term health effects in humans is limited and most existing studies have focused on developing countries where malnutrition may be a factor, or dietary choices are otherwise limited.

Lectin-free diet

The first writer to advocate a lectin-free diet was Peter J. D'Adamo, a naturopathic physician best known for promoting the Blood type diet. He argued that lectins may damage a person's blood type by interfering with digestion, food metabolism, hormones, insulin production—and so should be avoided. D'Adamo provided no scientific evidence nor published data for his claims, and his diet has been criticized for making inaccurate statements about biochemistry.

Steven Gundry proposed a lectin-free diet in his book The Plant Paradox (2017). It excludes a large range of commonplace foods including whole grains, legumes, and most fruit, as well as the nightshade vegetables: tomatoes, potatoes, eggplant, bell peppers, and chili peppers. Gundry's claims about lectins are considered pseudoscience. His book cites studies that have nothing to do with lectins, and some that show—contrary to his own recommendations—that avoiding the whole grains  wheat, barley, and rye will allow increase of harmful bacteria while diminishing helpful bacteria.

Toxicity
Lectins are one of many toxic constituents of many raw plants that are inactivated by proper processing and preparation (e.g., cooking with heat, fermentation). For example, raw kidney beans naturally contain toxic levels of lectin (e.g. phytohaemagglutinin). Adverse effects may include nutritional deficiencies, and immune (allergic) reactions.

Hemagglutination
Lectins are considered a major family of protein antinutrients, which are specific sugar-binding proteins exhibiting reversible carbohydrate-binding activities. Lectins are similar to antibodies in their ability to agglutinate red blood cells.

Many legume seeds have been proven to contain high lectin activity, termed hemagglutination. Soybean is the most important grain legume crop in this category. Its seeds contain high activity of soybean lectins (soybean agglutinin or SBA).

History
Long before a deeper understanding of their numerous biological functions, the plant lectins, also known as phytohemagglutinins, were noted for their particularly high specificity for foreign glycoconjugates (e.g., those of fungi and animals) and used in biomedicine for blood cell testing and in biochemistry for fractionation.

Although they were first discovered more than 100 years ago in plants, now lectins are known to be present throughout nature. The earliest description of a lectin is believed to have been given by Peter Hermann Stillmark in his doctoral thesis presented in 1888 to the University of Dorpat. Stillmark isolated ricin, an extremely toxic hemagglutinin, from seeds of the castor plant (Ricinus communis).

The first lectin to be purified on a large scale and available on a commercial basis was concanavalin A, which is now the most-used lectin for characterization and purification of sugar-containing molecules and cellular structures. The legume lectins are probably the most well-studied lectins.

See also
 Glycan-protein interactions
 Bacillus thuringiensis
 Lectin pathway, ficolin
 Toxalbumin

References

Further reading

External links
 Major Lectins & Conjugated Lectins from different natural sources
 Functional Glycomics Gateway, a collaboration between the Consortium for Functional Glycomics and Nature Publishing Group
 Proteopedia shows more than 800 three-dimensional molecular models of lectins, fragments of lectins and complexes with carbohydrates
 EY Laboratories, Inc., Lectin and Lectin Conjugates manufacturer
 Recombinant Protein Purification Handbook 
 Immobilized lectins, chromatography media
 Medicago AB, Lectin and Lectin Conjugates manufacturer
 Con A , pokeweed lectin , Artocarpus lectin , Pterocarpus lectin  , Urtica lectin  

Immunology
Carbohydrates
Proteins
Glycoproteins
Lectins